The 2019 New York City Public Advocate special election was held on February 26, 2019, to fill part of the unexpired term of Letitia James's vacated seat as New York City Public Advocate. It was triggered on January 1, 2019, when James resigned to take office as Attorney General of New York.

By statute, New York City Council Speaker Corey Johnson served as acting Public Advocate for the time between James’ resignation and the inauguration of Jumaane Williams, who won the election.

As with all special elections in New York City, it was officially nonpartisan, and candidates who file for the race had to create a unique party line that will be displayed on the ballot. A partisan primary and a November general election were held later in 2019 to complete the remaining years of James' term.

As of 2022, this is the most recent election where a Republican party politician received the most votes in Queens County.

Candidates

Declared
Following ballot petition challenges and appeals, the Board of Elections certified the subsequent list of candidates that are in chronological order of petition filings, along with their unique party lines, who appeared on the ballot in this sequence:
 Melissa Mark-Viverito (Fix the MTA), former Democratic Speaker of the New York City Council
 Michael Blake (For The People), Democratic New York State Assemblymember and a Vice Chair of the Democratic National Committee
 Dawn Smalls (No More Delays), attorney
 Eric Ulrich (Common Sense), Republican New York City Councilmember
 Ydanis Rodríguez (Unite Immigrants), Democratic New York City Councilmember
 Danny O'Donnell (Equality For All), Democratic New York State Assemblymember
 Rafael Espinal (Livable City), Democratic New York City Councilmember and former State Assemblymember
 Latrice Walker § (Power Forward), Democratic New York State Assemblymember
 Jumaane Williams (It's Time Let's Go), Democratic New York City Councilmember and candidate for Lieutenant Governor in 2018
 Ron Kim (No Amazon), Democratic New York State Assemblymember
 Benjamin Yee (Community Strong), activist
 Manny Alicandro (Better Leaders), lawyer
 Nomiki Konst (Pay Folks More), activist and journalist
 David Eisenbach (Stop REBNY), professor and Democratic candidate for Public Advocate in 2017
 Jared Rich (Jared Rich for NYC), attorney
 Anthony Herbert (Residents First), activist
 Helal Skeikh (Friends of Helal), former Democratic City Council candidate

Disqualified
 Theo Chino, bitcoin entrepreneur
 Ifeoma Ike (Bring a chair), activist
 Walter Iwachiw, perennial candidate
 Abbey Laurel-Smith, artist
 Danniel Maio, business owner
 Gary Popkin, professor
 Michael Zumbluskas, activist

Declined
 Chirlane McCray, First Lady of New York City
 Christine Quinn, former Speaker of the New York City Council

§ Indicates candidate has withdrawn from race but will still appear on ballot

Campaign
Speculation about a possible special election began before incumbent Tish James had won the Democratic primary for the office of New York Attorney General, with former speakers of the New York City Council Christine Quinn and Melissa Mark-Viverito being mentioned by the Gotham Gazette as potential frontrunners. Of the two, Quinn was considered a moderate Democrat, while Mark-Viverito was seen as being on the left of the party. Republican city councillor Joe Borelli was also considered a likely candidate, as the almost certainly numerous Democratic field was considered to have the potential to divide the vote enough for a Republican to win, despite New York City's heavily Democratic lean. James proceeded to win the Attorney General primary, creating an almost certain opening for the Public Advocate seat. The results of the statewide Democratic primaries that year created another frontrunner for the race, New York City councillor Jumaane Williams, who had narrowly lost the Democratic primary for Lieutenant Governor of New York, but had performed well in New York City, especially in Brooklyn.

The first candidate to enter the race was activist Nomiki Konst on September 27, 2018. Konst, a democratic socialist, announced an intent to run as an outsider. State assemblyman Michael Blake entered the race on October 19, and Williams announced his candidacy four days later. Williams was considered to be a staunchly left-wing Democrat, granting him potential support from the powerful progressive movement in the city, and his declaration that he would not run for Mayor of New York City in 2021 was thought to potentially allow him to win the support of prospective mayoral contenders. However, Williams' past socially conservative statements were considered a potential liability of his, in spite of his repudiation of said statements. City councillor Eric Ulrich eventually emerged as the strongest Republican candidate. A moderate Republican, Ulrich declared that he was "Pro-choice and Pro-Labor rights", and it was considered possible for him to win support from moderate Democrats, but his opposition to President Donald Trump was considered likely to depress Republican turnout. Mark-Viverito entered the race on November 27. Several other candidates entered the race over the course of late 2018, such as State assemblymen Daniel O'Donnell and Ron Kim, as well as City councillors Rafael Espinal and Ydanis Rodriguez. Of these candidates, O'Donnell was considered to have an asset in that his assembly district was highly affluent and had a reputation for high voter turnout.

A total of 17 candidates had their petitions to get on the ballot approved by the Board of Elections. Originally, only 16 candidates were approved, but an appeal by minor candidate Helal Shiekh was successful and he was placed on the ballot. The large field of candidates, featuring several prominent politicians, divided the New York City Council, with few members making endorsements as they had good relations with several different candidates. In December 2018, several ballot initiatives were passed in New York City that made it substantially easier for candidates to publicly finance their campaigns. This development was viewed as harming Mark-Viverito's campaign, as under the old financing rules she had had a large fundraising advantage over all other candidates, due to her several high-profile campaigns for the City Council. Mark-Viverito's campaign also suffered from many left-wing groups, which had previously supported her, becoming disillusioned with her as a result of her tenure as City council speaker, where she had compromised on reforming the New York Police Department and had closely collaborated with Mayor Bill de Blasio on controversial rezoning decisions.

The issues of Amazon potentially opening a large headquarters in New York and the mayoralty of de Blasio were both highly prevalent among the campaigns. Most candidates vocally opposed Amazon's plan, with Ulrich being the only exception. Most candidates also strongly criticised de Blasio's policies on housing rezoning and his pro-Amazon actions, and especially criticised his plans to run for President of the United States. As the campaign progressed, Williams and Mark-Viverito emerged as the only candidates with a realistic shot at winning the election, though Blake was regarded as being third in the race and having an outside chance at winning. Williams' campaign suffered from numerous controversies, such as allegations that he had not dealt with abusive behaviour within his campaign staff and revelations that he had received 27 speeding violations in school zones, but these controversies were noted as having surprisingly little effect on his popularity.

Debates

Endorsements

Results

Analysis
Eli Valentin of the Gotham Gazette noted that Mark-Viverito had failed to win support from Latino voters that had been expected to back her campaign, which he attributed to both the presence of other Latino candidates in the race in the form of Rodriguez and Espinal, as well as Williams' surprisingly strong performance among Latino voters. Williams' margin of victory was considered surprisingly large.

References

New York City Public Advocate special election
Public Advocate special election
New York City Public Advocate elections
New York City Public Advocate special
New York City Public Advocate special election